Hong Mei or Mei Hong is the name of:

Surnamed Hong
 Mei Hong (chemist) (born 1970), Chinese-American chemist
 Hong Mei (athlete) (born 1982), Chinese shot putter

Surnamed Mei
 Mei Hong (computer scientist) (born 1963), Chinese computer scientist

See also
Hongmei (disambiguation)